The Old Swimmin' Hole was a poem written by James Whitcomb Riley under the pen name "Benjamin F. Johnson of Boone County". The poem was first published in 1883 as part of a book entitled The Old Swimmin' Hole and 'Leven More Poems. The poem is one of Riley's most famous and is written in eye dialect. It tells of events in Riley's youth as he reminisces about the Brandywine Creek, where he played with his friends during his boyhood. The poem was included in several other releases of Riley's works and has sold millions of copies.

References

External links

The Old Swimmin' Hole at Poetry Foundation

1883 poems
James Whitcomb Riley
American poems
Poems adapted into films
Works published under a pseudonym